Lona may refer to:

Places
Lac de Lona, lake in Valais, Switzerland
Lona, Samoa, village on the island of Upolu
Lona, Nantou, Bunun village in Nantou County, Taiwan
Lona, Comilla, village in Comilla District, Chittagong Division, Bangladesh

People
Lona Andre, American film actress
Lona Barrison, one of the Barrison Sisters
Lona Cohen, American spy for the USSR
Lona Minne, American politician
Lona Williams, American television producer

Other
Lona (novel), 1923 Welsh novel by Thomas Gwynn Jones
 Lona, dialect of the Sawila language of Indonesia